Muriel Pollock (January 21, 1895 – May 25, 1971) was an American songwriter, composer, pianist, and organist. She wrote and performed music for Broadway shows, radio programs, children's plays, and piano rolls.

Early life 
Mary Pollock was born in Kingsbridge, New York, the daughter of Joseph Pollock and Rose Graff. Both parents were immigrants from Russia. Her father ran a news stand. She studied at the New York Institute of Musical Art, a precursor of the Juilliard School.

Career 
As a young woman, Pollock played the organ in silent movie theatres, and worked at her father's news stand. She wrote a musical, Mme. Pom Pom, in 1914, with Marie Wardall. Another 1914 work, "Carnival", was written for a fundraising event for the Sanitarium for Hebrew Children in Rockaway Park. Pollock's Broadway credits included Jack and Jill (1923), for which she supplied "additional music"; Rio Rita (1927-1928) and Ups-a Daisy (1928), in which she appeared playing piano duets with Constance Mering; Pleasure Bound (1929), for which she wrote the music; and the musical revue Shoot the Works (1931), for which she wrote both music and lyrics.

Pollock worked at Mel-o-Dee Music Company and Rhythmodik Music Corporation, composing, arranging, and playing works for piano roll. She later performed duets with Vee Lawnhurst, as The Lady Bugs or The Lady Fingers, and played one piano roll duet with George Gershwin. In 1922 she sang and played piano in Bermuda, in a grand concert at the Colonial Opera House. She made many recordings between 1927 and 1934, most of them on the Edison label. She was a frequent pianist on radio programs, sometimes playing her own "compositions especially for radio", and sometimes playing other works or accompanying other performers. She became an ASCAP member in 1933. After her second marriage, she wrote music for children's shows using the pseudonym Molly Donaldson, based on fairy tales or historical figures' lives, but her family's move to California took her away from the hub of radio work.

Personal life 
Muriel Pollock married twice. Her first husband was Leon Leroy Groll; they married in 1925, and divorced by 1930. She became the stepmother of child actor Ted Donaldson when she married his widowed father, songwriter Will Donaldson, in 1933. Will Donaldson died in 1954; she died in 1971, aged 76 years, in Hollywood. She left support for a liberal arts scholarship at Los Angeles City College. Remastered recordings by Pollock are available in updated formats, including a 1998 CD, titled Keyboards of the Gershwin Era, Volume VI.

References

External links 

 
 
 Muriel Pollock and Darl MacBoyle, "When A "Rambling Rose" Goes Rambling Home Again" (1921). Vocal Popular Sheet Music Collection. Score 4614, University of Maine.
 "Just Keep on Skating" (1917), composed by Muriel Pollock; a MIDI file and PDF of the sheet music, at the Ragtime Dorian Henry blog.
 Ted Tjaden, "Women Composers of Ragtime", website includes several pieces of sheet music by Muriel Pollock.

1895 births
1971 deaths
American women composers
Ragtime composers
Juilliard School alumni
20th-century American composers
20th-century women composers
20th-century American pianists
20th-century American women pianists
Musicians from the Bronx